Charvieu-Chavagneux is a commune in the Isère department in southeastern France.

The Bourbre forms most of the commune's eastern border.

Population

Personalities
 Jean Djorkaeff, professional football player
 Roger Girerd, mass murderer
 Edward Stachura, Polish poet, philosopher and prose writer

International relations
The commune is twinned with:
 Nauheim, Germany
 Nole, Italy
 Korosten, Ukraine
 Vagharshapat, Armenia

See also
Communes of the Isère department

References

Communes of Isère